Limón International Airport  in Limón, Costa Rica, is one of the four international airports in that country.

Puerto Limón and the southern Caribbean area towns of Cahuita, Puerto Viejo, Manzanillo and Gandoca, as well as the indigenous communities of Bri Bri, Hone Creek, Carbon 1 and 2, Shiroles and Suretka are all within two hours of the airport by ground transportation.

Although labelled as an international airport, its current passenger flights are only domestic. Nature Air, when it was last active, flew only charter flights to Limón. SANSA Airlines flies charter flights upon request from San José's Juan Santamaria International Airport.

The Limon VOR/DME (Ident: LIO) is located on the field.

History
The airport re-opened on 1 July 2006 after being closed nearly 20 years for domestic flights. It is the primary airport serving the Caribbean side of Costa Rica.

The Presidency Ministry announced in June 2011 that Sansa Airlines would begin regular scheduled flights four times a week to Limón Airport, beginning in July and costing ₡30,000–₡75,000 ($60–$150), to increase tourism to Limón Province.

There are plans to modernize the airport with a new passenger terminal that reflects the local culture as well as being environmentally friendly.

The landing area will be expanded from 10 meters wide to 18 meters, and up to 1137 meters in length.

Airlines and destinations

See also
 Transport in Costa Rica
 List of airports in Costa Rica

References

External links 
 OpenStreetMap - Limón
 Sansa
 
 Airport photographs

Airports in Costa Rica
Buildings and structures in Limón Province